KTHP (103.9 FM, "Classic Country Favorites") is a radio station broadcasting a classic country music format. Licensed to Hemphill, Texas, United States, the station serves the Lufkin-Nacogdoches area. The station is currently owned by Baldridge-Dumas Communications and features programming from Westwood One.

References

External links
 
 

THP
Classic country radio stations in the United States
Radio stations established in 1975